Viacheslav Sergeyevich Emeliantsev (born 4 May 1994) is a Russian Paralympic swimmer. He represented Russian Paralympic Committee athletes at the 2020 Summer Paralympics.

Career
Emeliantsev represented the Russian Paralympic Committee athletes at the 2020 Summer Paralympics in the 100 metre backstroke S14 event and won a silver medal and in the 200 metre freestyle S14 event and won a bronze medal.

References

1994 births
Living people
Sportspeople from Yekaterinburg
Medalists at the World Para Swimming Championships
Medalists at the World Para Swimming European Championships
Paralympic swimmers of Russia
Swimmers at the 2020 Summer Paralympics
Medalists at the 2020 Summer Paralympics
Paralympic medalists in swimming
Paralympic gold medalists for the Russian Paralympic Committee athletes
Paralympic silver medalists for the Russian Paralympic Committee athletes
Russian male freestyle swimmers
Russian male backstroke swimmers
S14-classified Paralympic swimmers
20th-century Russian people
21st-century Russian people